Robert Codrington may refer to:

Robert Codrington (translator)  (c.1602–c. 1665), English author
Sir Robert Edward Codrington (1869–1908), British colonial administrator
Robert Henry Codrington (1830–1922), English Anglican priest and anthropologist 
Robert Codrington (British Army officer)